Dugoni is an Italian surname. Notable people with the surname include:

Antonio Dugoni (1827–1874), Italian painter
Arthur A. Dugoni (born 1925), American dentist
Bruno Dugoni, Italian footballer
Graham Dugoni (born 1986), American soccer player and entrepreneur 
Robert Dugoni (born 1961), American writer

Italian-language surnames